The Church of St. Nicholas "Pensky" ("Nicholas-on-the-Stumps") is a smaller (winter) church of Fyodorovsky parish on the right bank of the Kotorosl River in Yaroslavl, in the district formerly known as Tolchkovo.

The tiny brick church represents a type of design known as the "ship", with an ornate bell tower in the west, connected by a low vestibule to the central cube with a single dome. It was constructed in 1689-90 in place of an earlier wooden church built in a cut-down grove 20 years earlier (hence the reference to tree stumps in the name). An ungainly chapel with a large entrance porch was added to the north wall in 1890. It is notable as the only church in Yaroslavl that remained open for worship throughout the Soviet period. The recent tombs of several local archbishops are near the south wall of the church.

References

External links 
 

Nicholas
Churches completed in 1690
1690 establishments in Russia
Cultural heritage monuments of regional significance in Yaroslavl Oblast